Nolinsky District is an administrative and municipal district (raion), one of the thirty-nine in Kirov Oblast, Russia. It is located in the south of the oblast. Its administrative center is the town of Nolinsk. Population:  25,170 (2002 Census);  The population of Nolinsk accounts for 45.8% of the district's total population.

References

Notes

Sources

Districts of Kirov Oblast